James Anthony McGrath (born 14 May 1974) is an Australian politician and Senator for Queensland since 2014. He is a member of the Liberal National Party of Queensland and sits with the Liberal Party in federal parliament. Following his re-election in 2022, McGrath was appointed as Shadow Assistant Minister for Finance and Shadow Assistant Minister to the Leader of the Opposition.

Early life
McGrath was born in Toowoomba, Queensland, Australia. He attended Toowoomba State High School and Nambour State High School, the latter known for its alma mater of notable politicians such as Kevin Rudd and Wayne Swan. He graduated from Griffith University, where he was President of the Griffith University Liberal Club, with a Bachelor of Commerce and Bachelor of Laws. He then completed a Master of Laws at the Queensland University of Technology. He was admitted as a solicitor and worked as an articled clerk in a legal firm before working with the Queensland Parliamentary Ombudsman between 1999 and 2001.

McGrath is a former political strategist who worked with Lynton Crosby on Boris Johnson's successful 2008 London mayoral campaign and on the Maldivian Democratic Party's 2008 presidential election victory.

Politics
Between 2009 and 2010, McGrath served as the deputy federal director of the Liberal Party of Australia. He was campaign director for the Liberal National Party and the Country Liberal Party between 2010 and 2012, during which the LNP recorded the largest ever electoral victory in the state of Queensland.

Senate
McGrath was elected to the Senate at the 2013 federal election. In 2014, his first speech consisted of calling for the Goods and Services Tax (GST) rate to rise to 15 percent, the abolition of federal education and healthcare, youth radio station Triple J and ABC to be privatised, and defended people's right to say "hurtful and bigoted and stupid and dumb things."

McGrath assisted in toppling both Tony Abbott, and Malcolm Turnbull as Liberal Party leaders. The night before Turnbull defeated Abbott for the leadership, McGrath joined a dinner with a close group of Turnbull number crunchers. McGrath was labelled by some as Turnbull's 'key numbers man'. During the Channel 7 election coverage, Australian radio broadcaster Alan Jones engaged McGrath in a heated debate. Jones accused McGrath of being ‘too panicked’ and taking the LNP down the path of Labor by supporting Turnbull. Jones told McGrath: 'There are a lot of bed-wetters in the Liberal Party and you seem to be the captain of the bed-wetters.'

Under Turnbull, McGrath was promoted to Assistant Minister to the Prime Minister. He served in this role from September 2015 to August 2018, and acted as Assistant Minister to the Minister for Immigration and Border Protection from February to July 2016.

After having supported Malcolm Turnbull in the 2015 leadership spill, McGrath swung his support behind fellow Queensland parliamentarian Peter Dutton against Turnbull in 2018. Consequently, he resigned from his executive position on 22 August 2018. McGrath was not promoted back into the outer ministry after his rebellion against Turnbull.

In May 2021, McGrath was preselected to lead the LNP Senate ticket for the 2022 federal election, defeating a challenge from Amanda Stoker for the number one position on the ticket. McGrath was reported to have had the support of senior Queensland cabinet ministers Peter Dutton and David Littleproud, and his 212–101 victory was seen as a rebuke of the LNP's insurgent 'Christian Right' factional grouping.

Controversy
In 2008, McGrath resigned from Boris Johnson's mayoral administration for allegedly racist comments. McGrath was asked if the election of Johnson as mayor might trigger a 'mass exodus of older Caribbean migrants' and replied that 'let them go if they don't like it here'.

In 2011, McGrath was revealed to have paid a disgruntled Labor staffer for dirt files on government MPs. McGrath orchestrated the research through disgruntled Labor staffer, Robert Hough. A sum of $3,075 was given to Hough to research the files. The sheet, organised by McGrath included information on politicians sex lives, sexual promiscuity, drinking habits, health matters and family breakdowns. The sheet even included details of the schools of government MP children. Though McGrath was merely reprimanded for his actions, there were strong calls for him to be sacked for his involvement in commissioning the research.

In July 2018, Senator McGrath was photographed alongside a group of Young LNP members with some making the "OK" hand gesture which has been come to be seen as a white supremacist symbol.

On 5 October 2019, Senator McGrath posted a picture on his Facebook page with the caption "Car 1. Flock of cockatoos 0." The picture depicted a dead and mangled cockatoo in the roof rack of a vehicle, presumably Senator McGrath's. This led to widespread condemnation online.

It was soon revealed that this was not the first post of its kind by the senator, who in 2007 posted a picture of two dead birds caught in the grill of a car with the caption "I think dinner tonight has been sorted thanks to my bullbar. Suggestions for how to cook the roadkill?" In other posts, he has suggested hitting as many as six kangaroos in a single evening and has referred to cockatoos as "menaces" and that "Anyone who thinks cockatoos are cute needs their head read by a suitably qualified medical professional".

Senator McGrath later updated the original caption suggesting that the context of the post had been "missed" and that the post was highlighting "the dangers faced by drivers" in the country.

References

External links
 Summary of parliamentary voting for Senator James McGrath on TheyVoteForYou.org.au

Living people
1974 births
Liberal National Party of Queensland members of the Parliament of Australia
Members of the Australian Senate
Members of the Australian Senate for Queensland
Australian solicitors
Australian political consultants
Griffith University alumni
Queensland University of Technology alumni
Turnbull Government
21st-century Australian politicians
Government ministers of Australia
20th-century Australian people